Tsetse and similar can mean :
 Tsetse fly, one of the large biting flies inhabiting much of mid-continental Africa between the Sahara and the Kalahari deserts
 Tse Tse Fly (band), a late 1980s/early 1990s British rock band
 De Havilland Mosquito, FB Mk XVIII version was nicknamed Tsetse
 Tsetse (nuclear primary), the common design nuclear fission bomb core for several Cold War designs for American nuclear and thermonuclear weapons
 Tsetse, North West, a village in South Africa